The border corners of Australia are the meeting points of state or territory borders. There are five such points, each recognised with a boundary marker, and all located in remote areas.

The five border corners are:

 Surveyor Generals CornerWA/NT/SA
 Poeppel CornerNT/SA/Qld
 Haddon CornerSA/Qld
 Cameron CornerSA/Qld/NSW
 MacCabe CornerSA/Vic/NSW

South Australia’s eastern border was supposed to follow the 141st meridian, but the first surveyors measured incorrectly. A 70 year border dispute followed, and eventually resulted in the disjointedness of MacCabe Corner, with Victoria using the original incorrect calculation, and New South Wales using the new and correct one.

References 

Borders of Queensland
Borders of New South Wales
Borders of South Australia
Borders of the Northern Territory
Borders of Western Australia
Borders of Victoria (Australia)